Adaiyur is a suburb of the town of Thiruvannamalai, in the Indian state of Tamil Nadu.  Administratively, it is a panchayat village of Tiruvannamalai taluk in Tiruvannamalai District. It is located on the Kanji road about 3 km northwest of downtown Thiruvannamalai. Panchayat President: M.Kalaivani munusamy from-(2020)

E. V. Velu of DMK is the MLA from Tiruvannamalai (state assembly constituency). Tiruvannamalai (Lok Sabha constituency) is the parliament constituency.

Demographics
Its 2011 population was 19560.

Notes

Cities and towns in Tiruvannamalai district